National Route 22 (officially, PY22) is a highway in Paraguay, which connects two northern departments of Paraguay, San Pedro and Concepción.

History
With the Resolution N° 1090/19, it obtained its current number and elevated to National Route in 2019 by the MOPC (Ministry of Public Works and Communications).

Distances, cities and towns

The following table shows the distances traversed by PY22 in each different department, showing cities and towns that it passes by (or near).

References

22